The following is a list of notable artworks by American artist Ivan Albright (1897–1983), organized by medium and listed chronologically.

Paintings

Drawings

References 

Lists of paintings
Lists of works of art